The JTA are an English two-piece Britrock band from Newcastle upon Tyne/London.

Career
The JTA began 2019 by stating that they would release a new song every two weeks through their website. Their anti-Brexit track "Water" was subsequently played on BBC Newcastle. The band have performed at venues across the UK including O2 Academy Newcastle and gained a reputation for appearing on stage wearing Balaclavas.

The band are also known for their work with local charities, most frequently Teenage Cancer Trust.

References

English rock music groups
Musical groups established in 2013
2013 establishments in England